Beluga is a census-designated place (CDP) in Kenai Peninsula Borough, Alaska, United States. The population was 20 at the 2010 census, down from 32 in 2000.

Geography
Beluga is located in the northern part of Kenai Peninsula Borough at  (61.133962, -151.164741), on the northwest side of Cook Inlet. The community is on the Alaskan mainland rather than the Kenai Peninsula proper. It is bordered to the north by Matanuska-Susitna Borough and to the south by the Tyonek CDP. Access is by air or by water, as the road network is local only.

The southern border of the CDP is the Chuitna River, and the Beluga River flows through the northern part of the CDP.

Demographics

Beluga first appeared on the 2000 U.S. Census as a census-designated place (CDP).

As of the census of 2000, there were 32 people, 13 households, and 7 families residing in the CDP. The population density was 0.3 people per square mile (0.1/km2). There were 54 housing units at an average density of 0.5/sq mi (0.2/km2). The racial makeup of the CDP was 75.00% White and 25.00% Native American.

There were 13 households, out of which 38.5% had children under the age of 18 living with them, 61.5% were married couples living together, and 38.5% were non-families. 23.1% of all households were made up of individuals, and none had someone living alone who was 65 years of age or older. The average household size was 2.46 and the average family size was 3.00.

In the CDP, the population was spread out, with 25.0% under the age of 18, 31.3% from 25 to 44, 34.4% from 45 to 64, and 9.4% who were 65 years of age or older. The median age was 42 years. For every 100 females, there were 128.6 males. For every 100 females age 18 and over, there were 140.0 males.

The median income for a household in the CDP was $0, and the median income for a family was $0. Males had a median income of $0 versus $0 for females. The per capita income for the CDP was $0. There were no families and none of the population living below the poverty line, including no under eighteens and none of those over 64.

Two prominent features are a small general store and the Chugach Electric power plant, which powers about half of Anchorage. The plant is situated on a gas reserve, which allows for on-site extraction of the gas to be used to fuel the plant.

Fishing

There are three main fishing rivers: the Beluga in the north (king salmon, silver salmon, and sockeye salmon), the Chuitna in the south (king salmon and silver salmon), and Three Mile Creek in the middle (silver salmon). Two other rivers, the Theodore and the Lewis (both with king salmon and silver salmon), are a short distance northeast of the CDP. There are countless freshwater lakes in the Beluga area.

Many set net fishers also fish from shore commercially to make a living. A good catch is about 100 salmon.

References

Census-designated places in Alaska
Census-designated places in Kenai Peninsula Borough, Alaska
Populated coastal places in Alaska on the Pacific Ocean
Road-inaccessible communities of Alaska